Moblake is a hamlet in Cheshire, England.

References

Villages in Cheshire